Kenevist (also Romanized as Kenevīst; also known as Kanvīst, Kanvīs, Kanavīs, Kanāwez, Kaneh Bīst, Kanvis, and Kenevīs) is a village in Kenevist Rural District, in the Central District of Mashhad County, Razavi Khorasan Province, Iran. At the 2006 census, its population was 3,218, in 792 families.

References 

Populated places in Mashhad County